This is a list of rivers in Guatemala arranged by drainage basin. This list is arranged by drainage basin, with respective tributaries indented under each larger stream's name.

Gulf of Mexico
The following rivers flow into the Grijalva River in Mexico and are part of the Gulf of Mexico drainage basin.  
Grijalva River (Mexico)
Usumacinta River (Guatemala and Mexico)
San Pedro River (Guatemala and Mexico)
Lacantún River (Mexico)
Xalbal River (Xaclbal River)
Ixcán River
Pasión River (Río de la Pasión)
San Juan River
Poxte River
Machaquila River
Cancuén River 
Salinas River
 Chixoy River (Río Negro)
 Salamá River
San Román River
Seleguá River (Guatemala and Mexico)
Nentón River (Guatemala and Mexico)
Cuilco River (Guatemala and Mexico)
Cabajchum River
Tzalá River
Las Manzanas River
Blanco River (San Marcos)

Gulf of Honduras
The following rivers are in the Gulf of Honduras drainage basin, which connects to he Gulf of Mexico.
Hondo River (Río Azul) (Belize and Mexico)
Belize River (Belize)
Mopan River (Guatemala and Belize)
Moho River (Guatemala and Belize)
Sarstoon River (Sarstún River) (Guatemala and Belize)
Gracias a Dios River
Chiyu River
Chahal River
Franco River
Chocón River
Dulce River
Chocón Machacas River
Lake Izabal
Polochic River
Matanzas River
Cahabón River
Lanquin River
Motagua River (Guatemala and Honduras)
Las Animas River
Bobos River
Pasabien River
Río Grande de Zacapa
Jupilingo River
Las Vacas River
Jalapa River

Pacific Ocean
The following rivers are in the Pacific Ocean drainage basin:
Suchiate River (Guatemala and Mexico)
Cabúz River
Cutzulchimá River
Ixben River
Nica River
Petacalapa River
Sibinal River
Naranjo River
Chisna River
Mujulia River
Ocosito River
Nil River
Nima River
Samalá River
El Tambor River
Nima I River
Nima II River
Oc River
Icán River
Sís River
Nahualate River
Ixtacapa River
Siguacán River
Madre Vieja River
Coyolate River
Xaya River
San Cristobal River
Pantaleón River
Acomé River
Achiguate River
María Linda River
Aguacapa River
Michatoya River
Lake Amatitlán
Villalobos River
Paso Hondo River
Los Esclavos River
Paz River (Guatemala, El Salvador)
Lempa River (Guatemala, El Salvador, Honduras)
Ostúa River

See also
 List of rivers of the Americas by coastline

References

, GEOnet Names Server
Mapa de Cuencas y Ríos (INSIVUMEH)
Principales ríos de Guatemala (INSIVUMEH)

Rand McNally, The New International Atlas, 1993.
Instituto Nacional de Sismologia, Vulcanolgia, Meteorologia e Hidrologia (INSIVUMEH) (in Spanish)

Guatemala
Rivers
Guatemala